William Gaston Caperton Jr. House, also known as "Wyndridge," is a historic home and national historic district located near Union, Monroe County, West Virginia.  The district includes nine contributing buildings. The main house was built in 1872, and is a large, almost square, two-story hipped roof Georgian plan house. The front facade features a one-story portico that is Greek Revival in form. The 1872 house incorporates two two-story late 18th century log structures and the early pioneer 1773 Blanton House.  Also on the property are the contributing log ice house and log smoke house, barn with vertical siding, a cattle scales and a machine shed, carriage shed, and a shed. Gaston Caperton, who served as Governor of West Virginia from 1989 to 1997, is a descendant of William Gaston Caperton Jr.

It was listed on the National Register of Historic Places in 1991.

References

Houses on the National Register of Historic Places in West Virginia
Georgian architecture in West Virginia
Greek Revival houses in West Virginia
Houses completed in 1773
Houses in Monroe County, West Virginia
National Register of Historic Places in Monroe County, West Virginia
Historic districts in Monroe County, West Virginia
Caperton family of Virginia and West Virginia
Historic districts on the National Register of Historic Places in West Virginia
Log buildings and structures on the National Register of Historic Places in West Virginia